The Statute Law Revision (Ireland) Act 1879 (42 & 43 Vict c 24), sometimes called the Irish Statute Law Revision Act, is an Act of the Parliament of the United Kingdom. The Bill for this Act was the Statute Law Revision (Ireland) Bill.

This Act was intended, in particular, to facilitate the preparation of a revised edition of the Irish statutes.

This Act was retained for the Republic of Ireland by section 2(2)(a) of, and Part 4 of Schedule 1 to, the Statute Law Revision Act 2007.

As to savings in this Act, see Queen v Justices of Meath. As to amendments by this Act, see The State (O'Connor) v O'Caomh-Anaigh.

Preamble
The Preamble to this Act was repealed by section 1 of, and First Schedule to, the Statute Law Revision Act 1894 (57 & 58 Vict c 56).

Schedule
The Schedule to this Act was repealed by section 1 of, and First Schedule to, the Statute Law Revision Act 1894.

See also
Statute Law Revision Act

References

Sources

 
Halsbury's Statutes of England. Second Edition. Butterworth & Co (Publishers) Ltd. 1950. Volume 24. Page 182.
The Statutes: Second Revised Edition. 1899. Volume 14:  . Page 937.
"The Revision and Repealing Statute of 1879" (1880) 24 The Journal of Jurisprudence 31
"1879: Ante-Union Statute Law Revision" (1881) 8 Journal of the Statistical and Social Inquiry Society of Ireland 152
"Ante-Union Statutes Affecting Ireland - II" (1894) 28 Irish Law Times and Solicitors' Journal 389
Hunt, Brian. The Irish Statute Book: A Guide to Irish Legislation. First Law Limited. 2007. Page 296.
Quekett, Arthur Scott. The Constitution of Northern Ireland. 1928. p 100.
"Statute Law Revision (Pre-Union Irish Statutes) Bill 1962", Seanad Eireann, Parliamentary Debates, Official Report, vol 55, col 1395

Citations

External links
  ["Note" and "Schedule" of the bill (unlike the schedule of the act as passed) gives commentary on each scheduled act, noting any earlier repeals and the reason for the new repeal]

United Kingdom Acts of Parliament 1879